Line 7 of the Madrid Metro is a rapid transit line that originally opened on 17 July 1974.

History
The line has been extended multiple times. This was a problem as line 7 was very underused. Pitis, however, was the only station on the Madrid metro to have restricted opening times. At the time, Pitis was a very small village, and the station's main purpose is to provide interchange for Renfe services.

Beginning in 2019, all trains are expected to terminate at Pitis following the opening of  station, which was previously constructed, but not opened due to the ongoing construction of the surrounding developments. Arroyofresno station was finally opened on 23 March 2019.

On 4 May 2007, Line 7 was extended from Las Musas to the towns of Coslada and San Fernando. At , next to Atlético Madrid's Metropolitano Stadium, passengers have to change trains for Metro-Este to Coslada and San Fernando - the so-called Line 7B.

Rolling stock
Line 7A, the primary portion of the line  from Pitis to Estadio Metropolitano, uses 6-car trains of class 9000. Line 7B, the extension to Hospital del Henares, uses 3-car trains of class 9000.

See also
 Madrid
 Transport in Madrid
 List of Madrid Metro stations
 List of metro systems

References

External links

  Madrid Metro (official website)
 Schematic map of the Metro network – from the official site 
 Madrid at UrbanRail.net
 ENGLISH User guide, ticket types, airport supplement and timings
 Network map (real-distance)
 Madrid Metro Map

07 (Madrid Metro)
Railway lines opened in 1974
1974 establishments in Spain